The 1892 United States presidential election in Idaho took place on November 8, 1892. All contemporary 44 states were part of the 1892 United States presidential election. State voters chose three electors to the Electoral College, which selected the president and vice president.

Background
This was the first time Idaho participated in a presidential election, having become the 43rd state on July 3, 1890. During its period as a territory Idaho had been divided between a strongly Republican northern half and an anti-Republican Mormon south, which in this first Presidential election was in places (notably Oneida County) still excluded from voting.

A wave of strikes in the silver-mining regions and even deeper conflict whereby an idled ore concentrator was destroyed in Gem, was to give the Populists a grip on the Mountain West that was not to be relinquished. Almost all the large number of dissenting farmers in the new state were to join with the silver interests to back Weaver's policies of nationalization of railways and communications, restriction of immigration, shorter working days and direct election of Senators. Although Senator-to-be William Borah campaigned for Harrison under the slogan that “a vote for Weaver was a vote for Cleveland and therefore against their own interests” Weaver's campaign against Republican Governor Norman Bushnell Willey’s declaration of martial law upon the miners, and against the absentee ownership of Idaho's land and water, ensured that these campaigns for Harrison would not be decisive.

Vote
Owing to the unpopularity in the West of his gold standard platform, the Democratic Party decided to not enter a Cleveland ticket in the race and to back Weaver. Idaho was won by the Populist nominees, James B. Weaver of Iowa and his running mate James G. Field of Virginia. Weaver and Field defeated the Republican nominees, incumbent President Benjamin Harrison of Indiana and his running mate Whitelaw Reid of New York.

Results

Results by county

See also
 United States presidential elections in Idaho

Notes

References

Idaho
1892
1892 Idaho elections